James Hines may refer to:

 James R. Hines Jr. (born 1958), American tax economist
 James Joseph Hines (1876–1957), American politician
 Jimmy Hines (1903–1986), American golfer
 Jim Hines (born 1946), American sprinter
 James Hines (born 1960), known as Bobby Fulton, American professional wrestler
 Jim C. Hines (born 1974), American writer
 James K. Hines (1852–1932), Associate Justice of the Supreme Court of Georgia

See also
 Hines (name), including a list of people with the name
 James Hind (c. 1616–1652), English highwayman
 James Hinesly (born 1931), Canadian football player
 Jim Hinds (born 1937), British cyclist
 Jim Himes (born 1966), American businessman and politician 
 James Hynes (born 1955), American novelist
 James P. Hynes, British businessman